Cantharidus dilatatus is a species of sea snail, a marine gastropod mollusk in the family Trochidae, the top snails.

Description
The shell grows to a length of 8 mm, its diameter also 8 mm.
The small, imperforate shell has a conical shape. It is spirally striated. Its sculpture consistis of numerous fine and inconspicuous spiral striae, more distinct and a little further apart on the base.

Its colour is cinereous, pink, or pinkish-brown, usually with white markings near the suture or tessellated with white. Sometimes a broad dark-brown band encircling
the periphery of the whorls, and one on the centre of the base. White zigzagbands are sometimes adorning the last 2 or 3 whorls. The epidermis is thin, slightly shining, easily worn off.

The spire is conical, as high as the aperture and a little convex. The apex is acute. The protoconch is very small, consisting of 1½ smooth, slightly convex whorls. The six whorls are slightly convex. The body whorl is obtusely angled at the periphery, and considerably expanded. The base of the shell is flat. The sutures are linear, but little impressed. The aperture is subrotund, oblique, inside mostly highly bluish-reddish iridescent and finely lirate. The outer lip is strengthened by an inner white callosity. The concave columella is vertical. The inner lip is broadly expanded, covering the umbilicus, and spreading as a broad white callosity over the
parietal wall.

Distribution
This marine species is endemic to New Zealand and occurs off the North, South, Stewart and Chatham Islands.

References

 Marshall, B.A. 1998: The New Zealand Recent species of Cantharidus Montfort, 1810 and Micrelenchus Finlay, 1926 (Mollusca: Gastropoda: Trochidae). Molluscan Research 19: 107-156 (p. 130)
 Powell A W B, New Zealand Mollusca, William Collins Publishers Ltd, Auckland, New Zealand 1979 
 Miller M & Batt G, Reef and Beach Life of New Zealand, William Collins (New Zealand) Ltd, Auckland, New Zealand 1973

External links
 To World Register of Marine Species
 

dilatatus
Gastropods described in 1870